Orgelbau Pirchner is an Austrian manufacturer of pipe organs, located in Steinach am Brenner, Tirol.

History 
The company was founded in 1817 by Franz Reinisch in Gries am Brenner, but moved to Steinach as early as 1825. In 1935 Johann Pirchner Sr. took over the company, but had to stop production during World War II. Between 1945 and 1973, the workshop built over 120 pipe organs. In 1973 his son, Johann Pirchner Jr., continued the Pirchner tradition, focusing on the construction of pipe organs with slider chests and tracker action. After building a new workshop in 1997, Johann Pirchner Jr. handed the company to his son Martin Pirchner, who took the Meisterprüfung in organ building in 1996.

Today 
Orgelbau Pirchner builds instruments for churches, concert halls, universities and schools. The company's primary focus is on designing and building slider chest organs with tracker-action. The scales of the pipes and their voicing are a modern interpretation of the principles of Andreas and Gottfried Silbermann.

Works (selection) 
P = Pedal keyboard

References

Links 
 Website Orgelbau Pirchner
  Documentary about Orgelbau Pirchner

Pipe organ building companies
Companies established in 1817
Musical instrument manufacturing companies of Austria
Economy of Tyrol (state)
Austrian brands